Empress Dan (單皇后, personal name unknown) (died  310) was an empress of the Xiongnu-led Chinese Han Zhao dynasty. She was the second wife of the founding emperor Liu Yuan (Emperor Guangwen).

Biography
Empress Dan's father Dan Zheng (單徵) was a Di chieftain, who submitted to Han Zhao in 308.  It is not known when she married Liu Yuan, but he made her his wife and empress in early 310, while also creating his son Liu He, by his first wife Empress Huyan crown prince.  However, Empress Dan's son Liu Ai (劉乂), while described as "young" in 310, was already capable of independent thinking, implying that he was an older child or young adult by that time.  Liu Yuan died later that year and was succeeded by Liu He, who was however overthrown and killed by Liu Cong after only a week as emperor.  Liu Cong initially offered the throne to Liu Ai, but Liu Ai declined, and Liu Cong took the throne himself.  He honored Empress Dan as empress dowager and named her son Liu Ai crown prince.

Empress Dowager Dan was described as still young and beautiful at that point, and she carried on an affair with Liu Cong, which was considered incest in Chinese culture.  Crown Prince Ai became aware of the affair and tried to persuade her to end it.  Knowing that her son knew about the affair, she died late in 310, described as having died "of her shame," implying that she might have committed suicide.

References 

310 deaths
Former Zhao empresses
Year of birth unknown
4th-century Chinese women
4th-century Chinese people